Zetela kopua is a species of sea snail, a marine gastropod mollusk in the family Solariellidae.

Description

Distribution
This marine species is endemic to New Zealand and found in the North Bounty Trough at depths between 1186 m and 2427m

References

 Marshall, B.A. 1999: A revision of the Recent Solariellinae (Gastropoda: Trochoidea) of the New Zealand region. The Nautilus 113: 4-42

External links

kopua
Gastropods described in 1999